AD 20 (XX) was a leap year starting on Monday of the Julian calendar. At the time, it was known as the Year of the Consulship of Marcus Valerius Messalla Barbatus and Cotta (or, less frequently, year 773 Ab urbe condita). The denomination 20 for this year has been used since the early medieval period, when the Anno Domini calendar era became the prevalent method in Europe for naming years.

Events

By place

Roman Empire 
 Galba, the future emperor, is a Roman praetor.
 Emperor Tiberius is forced to order an investigation and a public trial in the Roman Senate, for the murder of Germanicus. Fearing he will be found guilty, Gnaeus Calpurnius Piso commits suicide.

By topic

Births

Deaths 
 Gnaeus Calpurnius Piso, Roman statesman and governor of Syria (b. 44 BC) 
 Vipsania Agrippina, wife of Gaius Asinius Gallus and former wife of Tiberius (b. 36 BC)
  Amanitore, Nubian Queen Regnant of the Kushitic Kingdom of Meroë

References 

0020

als:20er#20